Ontario was a federal electoral district represented in the House of Commons of Canada from 1925 to 1997. It was located in the province of Ontario. This riding was created in 1924 from Ontario South riding.

It initially consisted of the townships of Pickering, Whitby (East and West), Reach, and Scugog, and the city of Oshawa in the county of Ontario. In 1947, the townships Scott and Uxbridge were added to the riding.

In 1966, it was redefined to consist of, in the County of Ontario, the Townships of Pickering, Reach, Scott, Scugog, Uxbridge, East Whitby and Whitby (excluding the area between the west limit of the City of Oshawa and the east limit of the Town of Whitby lying south of the road allowance between Concessions 2 and 3), and, in the County of York, the Townships of Georgina and North Gwillimbury, and all the islands of Georgina Island Indian Reserve No. 33.

In 1976, it was redefined to consist of the Township of Uxbridge, and the Towns of Ajax, Pickering and Whitby. In 1987, the Township of Uxbridge was excluded from the riding, along with the part of the Town of Whitby north of  Taunton Road East and Taunton Road West (Durham Regional Road No. 4).

The electoral district was abolished in 1996 when it was redistributed between Pickering—Ajax—Uxbridge and Whitby—Ajax ridings.

Members of Parliament

This riding has elected the following Members of Parliament:

Election results

|- 
  
|Conservative
|Thomas Erlin Kaiser   
|align="right"| 7,835    
  
|Unknown
|Lawson Omar Clifford  
|align="right"| 6,595

|- 
  
|Conservative
|Thomas Erlin Kaiser  
|align="right"| 8,567    
  
|Liberal
|William Henry Moore  
|align="right"|  7,689

|- 
  
|Liberal
|William Henry Moore 
|align="right"|  10,116   
  
|Conservative
|Thomas Erlin Kaiser  
|align="right"| 9,646

|- 
  
|Liberal
|William Henry Moore 
|align="right"|10,228   
  
|Conservative
|Alex C. Hall 
|align="right"| 7,300    
 
|Co-operative Commonwealth
|William Edmund Noble 
|align="right"| 1,847   
  
|Reconstruction
|Robert Myers Holtby
|align="right"| 1,412

|- 
  
|Liberal
|William Henry Moore  
|align="right"|  12,176   
  
|National Government
|Harry Allen Newman 
|align="right"|7,914

|- 
  
|Liberal
|W. E. N. Sinclair  
|align="right"|12,079   
  
|Progressive Conservative
|James Ross MacBrien 
|align="right"| 8,996    
 
|Co-operative Commonwealth
|Robert Lorne McTavish 
|align="right"| 4,389   
  
|Labor–Progressive
|Alexander James Turner 
|align="right"|  671

|- 
 
|Co-operative Commonwealth
|Arthur Henry Williams  
|align="right"|  10,187   
  
|Liberal
|Lyman Alfred Gifford 
|align="right"| 8,311   
  
|Progressive Conservative
|Frank McCallum 
|align="right"|7,541

|- 
  
|Liberal
|Walter Thomson  
|align="right"| 13,412   
  
|Progressive Conservative
|Frank McCallum 
|align="right"|  9,803    
 
|Co-operative Commonwealth
|Arthur Henry Williams 
|align="right"| 9,344

|- 
  
|Progressive Conservative
|Michael Starr
|align="right"| 12,275    
  
|Liberal
|John Legge Lay 
|align="right"| 9,091   
 
|Co-operative Commonwealth
|Herbert Roy Scott 
|align="right"|8,464

|- 
  
|Progressive Conservative
|Michael Starr 
|align="right"|  12,482    
  
|Liberal
|John Lay
|align="right"|11,285   
 
|Co-operative Commonwealth
|J. Wesley Powers  
|align="right"|5,524   
  
|Labor–Progressive
|Thomas Lloyd Peel  
|align="right"| 393

|- 
  
|Progressive Conservative
|Michael Starr 
|align="right"| 18,468    
 
|Co-operative Commonwealth
|W. John Naylor 
|align="right"| 13,806   
  
|Liberal
|Claude H. Vipond
|align="right"| 10,896

|- 
  
|Progressive Conservative
|Michael Starr
|align="right"| 26,887    
  
|Liberal
|Claude H. Vipond 
|align="right"| 10,848   
 
|Co-operative Commonwealth
|John Brady
|align="right"|  8,023   
  
|Independent
|Helge Neilson 
|align="right"| 248

|- 
  
|Progressive Conservative
|Michael Starr
|align="right"|23,158    
  
|Liberal
|Norman Cafik
|align="right"| 16,051   
 
|New Democratic
|Aileen Hall  
|align="right"| 14,461   
  
|Social Credit
|Allan A. Alton
|align="right"|488

|- 
  
|Progressive Conservative
|Michael Starr
|align="right"| 22,902    
  
|Liberal
|Norman Cafik
|align="right"| 20,174   
 
|New Democratic
|Aileen Hall 
|align="right"| 15,020

|- 
  
|Progressive Conservative
|Michael Starr
|align="right"|22,752    
  
|Liberal
|Claude Vipond  
|align="right"| 20,515   
 
|New Democratic
|Oliver Hodges 
|align="right"| 16,207   
  
|Independent
|James Edward Rundle 
|align="right"| 1,026

|- 
  
|Liberal
|Norman Cafik
|align="right"|  13,483   
  
|Progressive Conservative
|Clark T. Muirhead 
|align="right"|  10,579    
 
|New Democratic
|Robert L. Wing 
|align="right"| 7,607

|- 
  
|Liberal
|Norman Cafik
|align="right"|  16,328   
  
|Progressive Conservative
|Frank McGee
|align="right"| 16,324    
 
|New Democratic
|Alban C. Ward 
|align="right"| 9,498

|- 
  
|Liberal
|Norman Cafik
|align="right"| 20,096   
  
|Progressive Conservative
|Joyce Bowerman
|align="right"| 15,590    
 
|New Democratic
|Bill Lishman  
|align="right"| 6,649

|- 
  
|Progressive Conservative
|Thomas Fennell
|align="right"| 22,583    
  
|Liberal
|Norman Cafik
|align="right"| 15,730   
 
|New Democratic
|Geoff Rison
|align="right"|  11,510   
  
|Libertarian
|Rolf H. Posma 
|align="right"| 160    
  
|Marxist–Leninist
|Dawn Carrell 
|align="right"| 72

|- 
  
|Progressive Conservative
|Thomas Fennell 
|align="right"| 19,963    
  
|Liberal
|Doug Dickerson 
|align="right"| 15,494   
 
|New Democratic
|Geoff Rison 
|align="right"| 12,812   

  
|Libertarian
|Rolf H. Posma
|align="right"| 211    
  
|Marxist–Leninist
|Dawn Carrell 
|align="right"| 42

|- 
  
|Progressive Conservative
|Thomas Fennell  
|align="right"|35,163    
  
|Liberal
|Gary Herrema
|align="right"| 14,519   
 
|New Democratic
|Geoff Rison 
|align="right"| 12,995

|- 
  
|Progressive Conservative
|René Soetens 
|align="right"| 34,969    
  
|Liberal
|John Roberts
|align="right"| 23,091   
 
|New Democratic
|Jim Wiseman 
|align="right"|  12,751   
  
|Libertarian
|D'Arcy Cain 
|align="right"| 485    
  
|Commonwealth of Canada
|Val Haché  
|align="right"| 147

|- 
  
|Liberal
|Dan McTeague
|align="right"| 38,680   
| 43.35
  
|Reform
|Don Sullivan   
|align="right"| 28,097
| 31.49    
  
|Progressive Conservative
|René Soetens   
|align="right"| 16,872
| 18.91    
 
|New Democratic
|Lynn Jacklin  
|align="right"| 2,746   
| 3.08
  
|National
|Rob McMenemy 
|align="right"| 869    
| 0.97
  
|Independent
|Doug Anderson  
|align="right"|  692
| 0.78  
  
|Libertarian
|George S. Kozaroff 
|align="right"|424   
| 0.48

  
|Natural Law
|Gerard Morris 
|align="right"| 352
| 0.39    
  
|Commonwealth of Canada
|Val Haché 
|align="right"| 55
| 0.06   
  
|Abolitionist
|Peter Woods
|align="right"|42
| 0.05

See also 

 List of Canadian federal electoral districts
 Past Canadian electoral districts

References

External links 

 Website of the Parliament of Canada

Former federal electoral districts of Ontario
Pickering, Ontario
Politics of Oshawa
Whitby, Ontario